Jemima Osunde (born 30 April 1996) is a Nigerian actress, model, and presenter. She gained exposure after playing Leila in the television series Shuga. Osunde was nominated for Best Actress in a Leading Role at the 15th Africa Movie Academy Awards for her performance in The Delivery Boy (2018).

Early life
Jemima Osunde is an Edo State native. She grew up with her mother, father, and older brothers. She is the last child and only daughter of her parents.

She studied physiotherapy at the University of Lagos. Osunde appeared in the film Jungle Jewel after being encouraged by her uncle to pursue acting in 2014.

Career
Osunde's first big break was her role as Laila in MTV Shuga, appearing in the fourth series. When the show moved to South Africa for its fifth series, Osunde was written out for a year. She returned for the sixth series when it return to Nigeria. In 2018, she starred alongside Linda Ejiofor in the second series of NdaniTV's Rumour Has It.

Osunde was back for the seventh series of MTV Shuga's Alone Together which went out nightly featuring "lockdown" conversations between the main characters during lockdown from coronavirus. All of the filmings were done by the actors who include Lerato Walaza, Sthandiwe Kgoroge, Uzoamaka Aniunoh, Mamarumo Marokane, and Mohau Cele.

In 2020, she was cast in Quam's Money, a sequel to the 2018 film New Money. The follow-up story follows what happens when a security guard (Quam) suddenly becomes a multi-millionaire.

Education
She attended Air Force Primary School, went on to Holy Child college for her secondary school education, and had her tertiary education at the College of Medicine, University of Lagos. In 2019, Osunde graduated from the University of Lagos with a degree in physiotherapy. Osunde joined the mandatory National Youth Service Corps orientation program and uploaded a picture of herself participating in the program.

Filmography

Jungle Jewel
Esohe 
Stella (2016)
My Wife & I (2017)
Isoken (2017)
New Money (2018)
Lionheart (2018)
The Delivery Boy (2018)
Quam's Money (2020)

Television
Shuga
Ojays (2015)
Inspector K (2018)
The Johnsons (2015)
This Is It (2016–2017)
Rumour Has It (2018)
Papa Benji (2020)

Awards and nominations

References

External links

Living people
Actresses from Edo State
Nigerian television actresses
Nigerian film actresses
University of Lagos alumni
21st-century Nigerian actresses
1996 births
Nigerian female models
Nigerian television presenters
Nigerian physiotherapists
Nigerian television personalities
Nigerian media personalities